Puskás is a Hungarian surname. Notable people with the surname include:

Ferenc Puskás (1927–2006), Hungarian football player and manager
FIFA Puskás Award, the player judged to have scored the most aesthetically significant and "most beautiful" goal of the year
Ferenc Puskás Stadium, former multi-purpose stadium in Budapest, Hungary
Puskás Akadémia FC, the young team of Videoton Football Club of Felcsút, Hungary
Puskás Cup, an international football tournament founded by the Puskás Akadémia FC
Puskás Ferenc Stadion (Budapest Metro), a station of the M2 (East-West) line of the Budapest Metro
Puskás Aréna, a stadium in Budapest, Hungary
Tivadar Puskás (1844–1893), Hungarian inventor of the telephone exchange
Tivadar Puskás (politician) (1952–), Hungarian politician
Ferenc Puskás I (1903–1952), Hungarian football player and manager, father of Ferenc Puskás
Lajos Puskás (1944–), Hungarian footballer 
Imre Puskás (1966–), Hungarian jurist and politician 
Stan Puskas (1946–), Czech footballer

See also 
82656 Puskás, main belt asteroid
 Pușcaș, Romanian surname

Hungarian-language surnames